Siobhan Stolle Dunnavant is an American physician and politician serving as a member of the Senate of Virginia. She is the sister of former Delegate Chris Stolle, Virginia Beach Sheriff Ken Stolle, and Virginia Beach Commonwealth Attorney Colin Stolle. Dunnavant represents Virginia’s 12th district, covering portions of western Henrico and Hanover Counties.

Early life and education 
Dunnavant was born and raised in Norfolk, Virginia. She earned a Bachelor of Science degree from Randolph College and a Bachelor of Nursing from the University of Virginia. After working as a nurse, Dunnavant earned a medical degree from the Eastern Virginia Medical School.}

Career 
Dunnavant was elected to the Senate of Virginia in November 2015 and assumed office on January 13, 2016. Dunnavant practices medicine as an OB-GYN and is the only doctor serving in the Virginia Senate.

Personal life 
Dunnavant is married to Lloyd Dunnavant. They have four children together.

References

External links
 
 
Official Legislative website

Living people
Republican Party Virginia state senators
Eastern Virginia Medical School alumni
Randolph College alumni
University of Virginia School of Nursing alumni
21st-century American politicians
21st-century American women politicians
Politicians from Norfolk, Virginia
People from Henrico County, Virginia
Year of birth missing (living people)